Károly Szíjártó (26 January 1927 – 21 September 2014) was a Hungarian jurist, who served as Chief Prosecutor of Hungary between 1975 and 1990.

References
 A magyarországi fő-főügyészek (HVG Archívum)
 CV on the website of the Hungarian Remembrance Committee

Hungarian jurists
1927 births
2014 deaths